Garragi (also Romanized as Garragī) is a village in Irafshan Rural District, Ashar District, Mehrestan County, Sistan and Baluchestan Province, Iran. At the 2006 census, its population was 35, in 5 families.

References 

Populated places in Mehrestan County